Daivari is a Persian surname. Notable people with the surname include:

Ariya Daivari (born 1989), American professional wrestler
Shawn Daivari (born 1984), American professional wrestler, brother of Ariya

Arabic-language surnames
Persian-language surnames